The New Hampshire Wildcats men's soccer team represents the University of New Hampshire in all NCAA Division I men's college soccer competitions. The Wildcats play in the America East Conference. They play in Wildcat Stadium in Durham, New Hampshire.

The Wildcats have seen a surge to the top under the guidance of head coach Marc Hubbard which has gained them both regional and national recognition. He has helped UNH secure 4 regular-season conference titles, 4 conference tournament titles, and 6 NCAA tournaments in his tenure. In recent years, the Wildcats have developed a rivalry with fellow America East member Vermont. The all-time record between the teams lies at 7-7-7 and both teams regularly compete for the America East title and have combined for the last 5 America East Conference tournament titles.

Coaching staff 
As of November 17, 2022

Postseason

NCAA Tournament 
New Hampshire has appeared in six NCAA Tournaments. They first appeared in the tournament in 1994. They didn't return to the national stage until 2017, achieving automatic qualification following their America East Conference tournament win. Their deepest runs into the tournament were in 2017 when they reached the Third Round before falling to Indiana and in 2021 when they also reach the Third Round before losing to Number 1 ranked Oregon State.

America East Conference Tournament 
New Hampshire secured their first ever conference tournament title in 2018 as they routed No. 5 UMBC 5-0 in the championship. This win kicked off a string of three consecutive America East tournament championships in the 2019 and 2020 seasons. In 2019, the Wildcats came in as the No. 1 seed and got by No. 3 Hartford 1-0 to clinch the title. In the 2020 season (played in 2021 due to the COVID-19 pandemic), UNH again came into the tournament as the No. 1 seed and held off No. 2 seeded Vermont 2-0 to complete the three-peat. After a loss to Vermont in 2021, the Wildcats captured their fourth America East championship in five years after defeating Albany 2-0.

Year by year results
{| class="wikitable"

|- align="center"

2022 Roster

References

External links 
 

 
Association football clubs established in 1924
1924 establishments in New Hampshire